Chloe Beck and Emma Navarro were the defending champions, but both players were no longer eligible to participate in junior events.

Eleonora Alvisi and Lisa Pigato won the title, defeating Maria Bondarenko and Diana Shnaider in the final, 7–6(7–3), 6–4.

Seeds

Draw

Finals

Top half

Bottom half

References

External links 
Draw at rolandgarros.com
Draw at ITFtennis.com

Girls' Doubles
French Open by year – Girls' doubles